Mizoram Law College is  the only law college in the entire state of Mizoram.

History
Mizoram Law College was established in 1983. Prior to its amalgamation with Liandingpuia Law College in 2004, the college existed as Aizawl Law College. The college was upgraded to deficit status in 2006 and got itself affiliated to Mizoram university. At present, it is located in Luangmual locality of Aizawl.   MLC is also recognized under section 2(f)of UGC Act 1956. It is also affiliated to the Bar council of India.

Course

At present, the college offers LL.B three years unitary course. The semester system has also been introduced from the current session 2010–2011. A team of dedicated 9 lecturers, both full-time and part-time, is imparting legal knowledge to hundreds of students every year. At present there are 293 students with 298 students who have completed their studies.

See also
Education in India
Education in Mizoram
Mizoram University
Literacy in India

References

External links
 

Universities and colleges in Mizoram
Colleges affiliated to Mizoram University
Law schools in Mizoram
Education in Aizawl